Henrietta Muir Edwards (18 December 184910 November 1931) was a Canadian women's rights activist and reformer.
She was the eldest of "The Famous Five", along with Emily Murphy, Nellie McClung, Louise McKinney and Irene Parlby, who fought to have women recognized as "persons" under the law, and for the woman's right to vote in elections.

She was born Henrietta Louise Muir in Montreal as well as lived in Montreal. She grew up in an upper-middle-class family that valued culture and religion. Edwards became active in many religious organisations, where she grew disenchanted with old traditions where the exclusion of women was acceptable.

Biography
Edwards was born on 18 December 1849.

As a young woman, Edwards and her sister Amélia founded a Working Girls’ Association in Montreal in 1875 to provide meals, reading rooms and study classes. This would become one of Canada's first YWCAs. They also published a periodical, The Working Women of Canada, which helped to bring working conditions into the public eye. This project was undertaken at their own expense, and was funded from their earnings as artists.

She married Dr. Oliver C. Edwards in 1876 and they had three children. They moved to Indian Head, Northwest Territories (now Saskatchewan), in 1883. Oliver was the government doctor for the Indigenous reserves there, and she continued to pursue women’s rights and feminist organizations on the prairies.

In 1890, Edwards’s husband fell ill, so the family moved to the nation's capital, Ottawa. There, Edwards "took up the cause of female prisoners", while also working with Lady Aberdeen, wife of the then Governor General of Canada, to create the National Council of Women of Canada (NCWC). The NCWC was founded in 1893, the same year the Canadian government commissioned Edwards, who was also an artist, to paint a set of dishes for the Canadian exhibit at the 1893 World's Columbian Exposition.

Edwards served for 35 years as their chair for Laws Governing Women and Children, and because of her expertise in this area of the law was appointed chair of the organization's Provincial Council of Alberta. With Lady Aberdeen she also helped establish the Victorian Order of Nurses (VON) in 1897.

Edwards and her family returned to the Northwest Territories in 1904, where her husband was posted to Fort Macleod as a medical officer to the Blood tribe.

During the latter period of the First World War, when supplies and morale were at a low, the Government of Canada selected individuals to assist in an advisory capacity about how to invoke stricter conservation measures. Mrs. Edwards was part of the selected committee, and it was the first time in Canadian history that a woman had been called upon for a review of public policy with the Government.

Edwards wrote two books about women and the legal problems she was trying to overcome, Legal Status of Canadian Women (1908) and Legal Status of Women in Alberta (1921). She worked with Louise McKinney, Irene Parlby and Emily Murphy to "lobby the Alberta government for recognition of dower and matrimonial property rights." This friendship and collaboration would be called upon again to fight for the Persons Case in the late 1920s, which established that Canadian women were eligible to be appointed senators and more generally, that Canadian women had the same rights as Canadian men with respect to positions of political power.

Edwards was buried in Mount Pleasant Municipal Cemetery, Edmonton. The memorial erected to her memory reads "Let her own works praise her. Her delight was in the law of the Lord" Her date of death on the memorial is given as 9 November 1931. Her date of death is listed as 10 November 1931 in the Canadian Encyclopedia.

Legacy
In 1962, Edwards was recognized as Person of National Historic Significance by the government of Canada. A plaque commemorating this is placed at the entrance to Fort Macleod Post Office, Haultain Ave & 22 St., Fort Macleod, Alberta. The "Persons case" was recognized as an Historic Event in 1997. In addition, in October 2009, the Senate voted to name Edwards and the rest of the Five, Canada's first "honorary senators."

References

External links
 
 Henrietta Muir Edwards

1849 births
1931 deaths
Canadian feminists
Persons of National Historic Significance (Canada)
Women in Alberta politics
Pre-Confederation Alberta people
20th-century Canadian politicians
20th-century Canadian women politicians